Patania emmetris is a moth in the family Crambidae. It was described by Turner in 1915. It is found in Australia, where it has been recorded from the Northern Territory.

References

Moths described in 1915
Moths of Australia
Spilomelinae
Taxa named by Alfred Jefferis Turner